Teuta Cuni (born 1973) is a retired Swedish amateur female lightweight boxer who has also practiced, but not competed in, kickboxing.

Medals
 Women's World Amateur Boxing Championships
 2001, Scranton – Bronze

 Women's European Amateur Boxing Championships
 2000 – Gold

 Women's Swedish Amateur Boxing Championships
 2000, Gävle – Gold
 2005, Umeå – Gold
 2006, Uppsala – Gold
 2007, Sundsvall – Gold

 Witch Cup
 2004, Pécs – Bronze

References

1973 births
Living people
Swedish women boxers
Lightweight boxers